Henry Robert Pigott (c. 1899 – c. 1981) was a rugby union player who represented Australia.

Pigott claimed 1 international rugby cap for Australia.

References

Australian rugby union players
Australia international rugby union players
Year of birth uncertain
Year of death missing
Rugby union players from New South Wales